The Bouverans Plantation House, also known as Arialo, is a historic house on a former plantation in Lockport, Louisiana. It was built in 1860 for M. J. Claudet. It was one of the most productive sugarcane plantations in the parish in 1871–1872.

The house was designed in the Creole and Greek Revival architectural styles. It has been listed on the National Register of Historic Places since July 21, 1983.

See also
 National Register of Historic Places listings in Lafourche Parish, Louisiana

References

Houses  on the National Register of Historic Places in Louisiana
Greek Revival architecture in Louisiana
Houses completed in 1860
Plantation houses in Louisiana
National Register of Historic Places in Lafourche Parish, Louisiana